The 2007–08 Persian Gulf Cup (also known as Iran Pro League) was the 25th season of Iran's Football League and seventh as Iran Pro League since its establishment in 2001. Saipa were the defending champions. The season featured 13 teams from the 2006–07 Persian Gulf Cup and three new teams promoted from the 2006–07 Azadegan League: Shirin Faraz as champions, Pegah and Sanat Naft. PAS Hamedan replaced PAS Tehran. The league started on 16 August 2007 and ended on 17 May 2008. Persepolis won the Pro League title for the first time in their history (total ninth Iranian title).

Teams

Below is the list of coaches who left their teams after the start of the season.

Participating in international competitions
2008 AFC Champions League
Persepolis
Sepahan

Final classification

Results table
Last updated March 17, 2008

Player statistics

Top goalscorers

18
  Hadi Asghari (Rah Ahan)
  Mohsen Khalili (Persepolis)
13
  Ibrahima Touré (Paykan)
12
  Ruhollah Bigdeli (Est. Ahvaz)
  Fereydoon Fazli (Saba Battery)
  Leo (Sanat Naft)
10
  Davoud Haghi (Est. Ahvaz)
  Milad Meydavoodi (Est. Ahvaz)
9
  Esmail Farhadi (Zob Ahan)
  Seyed Mohammad Hosseini (Aboomoslem)
  Mahmoud Karimi (Sepahan)
  Saber Mirghorbani (Sanat Naft)
  Mohammad Nasser (Bargh Shiraz)
  Bahman Tahmasebi (Fajr Sepasi)
  Alireza Vahedi Nikbakht (Pesepolis)
  Zaltron (Mes Kerman)
8
  Arash Borhani (Esteghlal)
  Mohammad Gholamin (Pas Hamedan)
  Mehdi Karimian (Bargh Shiraz)
  Emir Obuća (Pas Hamedan)
  Jalal Rafkhaei (Malavan)
  Emad Reza (Foolad)

Top goalassistants

8
  Davoud Haghi (Est. Ahvaz)
  Mojtaba Jabari (Esteghlal)
7
  Khosro Heidari (Pas Hamedan)
  Mehdi Shiri (Bargh Shiraz)
  Alireza Vahedi Nikbakht (Persepolis)
6
  Abbas Aghaei (Persepolis)
  Ehsan Hajsafi (Sepahan)
  Reza Nasehi (Aboomoslem)
  Mohammad Navazi (Esteghlal)
  Ahmad Taghavi (Rah Ahan)

Cards

Matches played
34
  Mojtaba Shiri (Est. Ahvaz)

Attendances

Average home attendances

Highest attendances

Notes:Updated to games played on 17 May 2008. Source: iplstats.com

See also
 2007–08 Azadegan League
 2007–08 Iran Football's 2nd Division
 2007–08 Iran Football's 3rd Division
 2007–08 Hazfi Cup
 Iranian Super Cup
 2007–08 Iranian Futsal Super League

References

 Iran Premier League Statistics
 Persian League

 

Iran Pro League seasons
Iran
1